Naukan Yupik language or Naukan Siberian Yupik language (Naukan Yupik: Nuvuqaghmiistun) is a critically endangered Eskimo language spoken by ca. 70 Naukan persons (нывуӄаӷмит) on the Chukotka peninsula. It is one of the four Yupik languages, along with Central Siberian Yupik, Central Alaskan Yup'ik and Pacific Gulf Yupik.

Linguistically, it is intermediate between Central Siberian Yupik and Central Alaskan Yup'ik.

Morphology
Chart example of the oblique case:

The non-possessed endings in the chart may cause a base-final 'weak' ʀ to drop with compensatory gemination in Inu. Initial m reflects the singular relative marker. The forms with initial n (k or t) are combined to produce possessed oblique with the corresponding absolutive endings in the 3rd person case but with variants of the relative endings for the other persons.

In proto-Eskimo, the ŋ is often dropped within morphemes except when next to ə. ŋ is also dropped under productive velar dropping (the dropping of ɣ,ʀ, and ŋ between single vowels), and "ana" goes to "ii" in theses areas.

Numerals
 ataasiq
 maalghut
 pingayut
 sitamat
 tallimat
 aghvinelek
 maalghugneng aghvinelek
 pingayuneng aghvinelek
 qulngughutngilnguq
 qulmeng
 atghanelek
 maalghugneng atghanelek
 pingayuneng atghanelek
 akimiaghutngilnguq
 akimiaq
 akimiaq ataasimeng
 akimiaq maalghugneng
 akimiaq pingayuneng
 yuinaghutngilnguq
 yuinaq

Notes

References
 
 

Languages of Russia
Endangered Eskaleut languages
Yupik languages
Siberian Yupik